Christi Leigh Craddick (born July 1, 1970) is an American politician. She is one of three members of the Railroad Commission of Texas, the elected regulatory body over oil, natural gas, utilities, and surface mining first established in 1891. She is a Republican. The commission ended all controls over railroads in 2005 but is still known as the "Railroad Commission"  for historical reasons.

A native of Midland, Texas, Craddick won her seat in the general election held on November 6, 2012.

Background

Craddick's father is State Representative Tom Craddick, a Midland businessman who was the Speaker of the Texas House of Representatives from 2003 to 2009.  Craddick has one daughter. She is Roman Catholic.

Craddick graduated from Midland High School, obtained her undergraduate degree from the University of Texas at Austin, and received her Juris Doctor from the University of Texas School of Law.

Election as Railroad Commissioner

2012 primary
Craddick's path to victory surged in the Republican runoff election held on July 31, 2012, when she easily defeated then State Representative Warren Chisum of Pampa in Gray County in the Texas Panhandle. Chisum is a former state legislative lieutenant of Tom Craddick. In that same election, most of the attention had focused not on the Craddick-Chisum race but on conservative Ted Cruz, who defeated Lieutenant Governor David Dewhurst for the Republican nomination to succeed U.S. Senator Kay Bailey Hutchison. Craddick raised triple the campaign contributions of Chisum, more than $1 million compared to $375,000, but Chisum had access to another $600,000 that he had accumulated earlier as a legislator. Craddick enjoyed the support of such wealthy donors as the entrepreneur James R. Leininger of San Antonio and the late homebuilder Bob J. Perry of Houston.

Craddick polled 589,211 votes (60 percent); Chisum, 396,858 ballots (40 percent).

2012 general election
Craddick thereafter defeated the Democratic nominee, Dale P. Henry (born 1930), a retired petroleum engineer from Lampasas in Central Texas. Craddick polled 4,336,499 votes (56 percent); Henry, 3,057,733 (40 percent). The remaining 4 percent was cast for two minor-party candidates.

Craddick succeeded Elizabeth Ames Jones of San Antonio, who vacated the seat in February 2012. Jones ran for the District 25 seat in the Texas State Senate, which was ultimately won by the Republican physician Donna Campbell of New Braunfels, who unseated incumbent Senator Jeff Wentworth, a Moderate Republican from San Antonio, in the party runoff on July 31. Interim commissioner Buddy Garcia, an appointee of Governor Rick Perry, stepped down several weeks after the 2012 general election, and Perry named Craddick to complete the few days remaining in Jones's term.

Craddick's two Republican colleagues on the railroad commission were David J. Porter of Giddings in Lee County, formerly of Midland, and the former chairman, Barry Smitherman, formerly of Houston. Smitherman, elected to a two-year unexpired term in 2012, did not seek a full six-year term in 2014; he instead ran for Texas attorney general to succeed Greg Abbott, but came in third place in the Republican primary. Since 1995, when veteran Democratic member James E. Nugent was unseated by Charles R. Matthews, all railroad commissioners have been Republicans. Both Craddick and Porter have ties to the oil-rich Permian Basin of Midland/Odessa.

Political analysis
Mark Jones, a political scientist at Rice University, attributed Craddick's victory over Chisum to the "respect" within the GOP for her father. Tom Craddick is the longest-serving Republican legislator in Austin, having first been elected in 1968. He lost the Speakership in 2009 to Joe Straus, a moderate Republican from San Antonio, who initially prevailed through a coalition of mostly Democrats and sixteen maverick Republicans.

Former Midland Mayor Ernest Angelo, a one-time Texas Republican National Committeeman, said that Craddick succeeded because she gained credibility with large Republican donors and traveled by highway to meet with the conservative grassroots and women's groups. According to Angelo, Tom Craddick's neighbor of many years, Christi Craddick "showed she will do what it takes to win a state primary. She earned it."

From the start of her term as commissioner, Craddick has been critical of federal intervention into the energy industries: "Texas knows how energy regulation is done. People ought to be modeling themselves after us, instead of ... the EPA," she told an energy policy group in Austin."

In August 2014, she was elected chairman of the Texas Railroad Commission.

2018 reelection
On March 16, 2018, Craddick with nearly 76 percent of the vote defeated her Republican primary opponent, Weston Martinez of San Antonio. She then defeated the Democrat Roman McAllen in the November 6 general election. Craddick polled 4,356,658 votes (53.2 percent) to McAllen's 3,588,625 ballots (43.9 percent). Another 236,720 votes (2.9 percent) went to the Libertarian Party nominee, Mike Wright.

Electoral history

References

External links

 

1970 births
21st-century American politicians
21st-century American women politicians
American politicians of Lebanese descent
Businesspeople from Texas
Catholics from Texas
Living people
Members of the Railroad Commission of Texas
Midland High School (Midland, Texas) alumni
People from Austin, Texas
People from Midland, Texas
Texas lawyers
Texas Republicans
University of Texas School of Law alumni